The Indian Association of Private Psychiatry (IAPP) is one of the largest association of privately practicing psychiatrists in India. It was founded in 2000 by Anirudh Kala.

References

External links
  Official Website

Mental health organisations in India
2000 establishments in India
Organizations established in 2000